Dante de Magistris is a chef and restaurateur, raised in  Belmont, Massachusetts. His first restaurant, dante was at the Royal Sonesta Hotel in East Cambridge, Cambridge, Massachusetts. The restaurant was named 2011 Best Italian Restaurant, Upscale by Boston (magazine).

He has appeared on The Early Shows Chef on a Shoestring segment.

Biography
In his early twenties, de Magistris went to Italy for a year, working in Florence and Bologna. He was sous chef at Ristorante Don Alfonso, a Michelin two star restaurant in Sant'Agata sui Due Golfi.  When he returned to Boston, he had the opportunity to work with or for Lydia Shire, Michael Schlow, Susan Regis and Michela Larson.

While at Don Alfonso, the head chefs went to France and left him in charge.  That was when the Michelin people came to the restaurant and they awarded it a third star.

Restaurants
dante was opened with brothers Filippo and Damian. Bon Appétit, in 2006, named it one of the Hot 10 Restaurants of the year. It closed in 2020.

Current restaurants include Il Casale. The Belmont location opened in 2009 and in 2014, he opened a location in Lexington, Massachusetts. He and his brothers opened The Wellington in 2018 which like Il Casale, is in  Belmont Center.

References

Living people
American restaurateurs
Chefs from Massachusetts
People from Belmont, Massachusetts
Restaurant founders
Year of birth missing (living people)